West End is an unincorporated community in Franklin and Saline counties in the U.S. state of Illinois. The portion of the community in Franklin County is part of Cave Township, while the portion in Saline County is part of Tate Township.

References

Unincorporated communities in Franklin County, Illinois
Unincorporated communities in Saline County, Illinois
Unincorporated communities in Illinois